The Apple S1 is the integrated computer in the Apple Watch, and it is described as a "System in Package" (SiP) by Apple Inc.

Samsung is said to be the main supplier of key components, such as the RAM and NAND flash storage, and the assembly itself, but early teardowns reveal RAM and flash memory from Toshiba and Micron Technology.

System-in-Package design
It uses a customized application processor that together with memory, storage and support processors for wireless connectivity, sensors and I/O constitute a complete computer in a single package. This package is filled with resin for durability.

Components
From reverse engineering, the processor handling the Wi-Fi and Bluetooth is a Broadcom BCM43342 and the six-axis gyroscope is from STMicroelectronics.

Apple designed 32-bit ARMv7 based application processor APL0778 as the central processing unit (CPU), with an integrated PowerVR SGX543 graphics processing unit (GPU).
512 MB DRAM from Elpida, wire bonded on top of the APL0778 CPU
NFC controller from NXP
NFC booster chip from AMS
8 GB flash from SanDisk and Toshiba
Wireless charging chip from IDT
Touch controller from ADI
Integrated gyro/accelerometer from STMicroelectronics
BCM43342 Wi-Fi/FM/BT combo chip from Broadcom
Power management unit (PMU) from Dialog Semiconductor

S1P 
The SiP in Apple Watch Series 1 is called S1P and looks superficially identical to the S1, but in reality is an S2 minus the on-chip GPS functionality. It contains the same dual-core CPU with the same new GPU capabilities as the S2 making it about 50% faster than the S1.

Announcement
The S1 was announced on 9 September 2014 as part of the "Wish we could say more" event.

The S1P was announced on 7 September 2016 as part of the "See you on the 7th" event.

Launch date
The S1 made its first appearance within the Apple Watch, which arrived in April 2015. The S1 was discontinued with the launch of Apple Watch Series 1, containing the S1P.

The S1P was released with the Apple Watch Series 1 on 16 September 2016.

Images

See also 
 Apple silicon, the range of ARM-based processors designed by Apple.
 Apple Watch
 Apple S2

References 

Apple silicon